Harry R. Truman (October 30, 1896 – May 18, 1980) was an American businessman, bootlegger, and prospector. He
lived near Mount St. Helens, an active volcano in the state of Washington, and was the owner and caretaker of Mount St. Helens Lodge at Spirit Lake near the base of the mountain. Truman came to fame as a folk hero in the months leading up to the volcano's 1980 eruption after refusing to leave his home despite evacuation orders. He was killed by a pyroclastic flow that overtook his lodge and buried the site under  of volcanic debris.

After Truman's death, his family and friends reflected on his love for the mountain. In 1981, Art Carney portrayed Truman in the docudrama film St. Helens. He was commemorated in a book by his niece, and also in various pieces of music, including songs by Headgear, Billy Jonas, and Shawn Wright and the Brothers Band.

Early life
Truman was born to foresters in Ivydale, West Virginia, in October 1896. He said he did not know his exact date of birth, but gave it as October 1896. Some noncontemporaneous sources have given his middle name as Randall, but Truman stated that he did not know his middle name, just the initial R. Truman's World War II draft registration card, dated April 27, 1942, lists his full name as "Harry Rainel Truman" and his date of birth as "Oct. 30, 1896."

Career 
He attended high school in the city of Mossyrock, Washington then enlisted in the U.S. Army as a private in August 1917. He was assigned to the 100th Aero Squadron, 7th Squad, and trained as an aeromechanic. He served in France during World War I.

During his service, he reportedly sustained injuries due to his audacious and independent nature. However, according to Washington State Archives, Truman served overseas from January 24, 1918, until February 1, 1919, but this record states he did not have wounds or injuries received in action and did not participate in any engagements. It also states he had a disability rating of zero at the time he was discharged.

While en route to Europe, his troopship, Tuscania, was sunk by a German U-boat in a torpedo attack off the coast of Ireland. Truman was honorably discharged on June 12, 1919, and he began prospecting, but failed to achieve his goal of becoming rich. He later became a bootlegger, smuggling alcohol from San Francisco to Washington during the Prohibition era.

At some point, Truman returned to Chehalis, Washington, where he ran an automotive service station called Harry's Sudden Service. He also married the daughter of a sawmill owner; they had one daughter.

Truman grew tired of civilization after a few years and leased  from the Northern Pacific Railroad Company overlooking Spirit Lake in the wilderness near Mount St. Helens, a stratovolcano of the Cascade Range located in Skamania County, Washington. He settled near the base of the mountain and opened a gas station and a small grocery store; he eventually opened the Mount St. Helens Lodge, close to the outlet of Spirit Lake, which he operated for 52 years.

During the 1930s, Truman divorced his first wife; he remarried in 1935. The second marriage was short, as he reportedly attempted to win arguments by throwing his wife into Spirit Lake, despite her inability to swim. He began dating a local girl, though he eventually married the girl's sister Edna, whom he called Edie. This third marriage held, and he and Edna operated the Mount St. Helens Lodge together until her death from a heart attack in 1978.

In the Mount St. Helens area, Truman became notorious for his antics, once getting a forest ranger drunk so that he could burn a pile of brush. He poached, stole gravel from the U.S. Forest Service, and fished on American Indian land with a fake game warden badge. Despite their knowledge of these criminal activities, local rangers failed to catch him in the act. The Washington state government later changed the state sales tax, but Truman kept charging the same rate at his lodge. A tax agency employee rented a boat from him, but refused to pay his tax rate, so Truman pushed him into Spirit Lake.

Truman was a fan of the cocktail drink consisting of Schenley whiskey and Coca-Cola. He owned a pink 1957 Cadillac, and he swore frequently. He loved discussing politics and reportedly hated Republicans, hippies, young children, and the elderly. He once refused to allow Supreme Court Justice William O. Douglas to stay at his lodge, dismissing him as an "old coot". When his wife Edna died in 1978, Truman closed his lodge and afterward only rented out a handful of boats and cabins during the summer.

Celebrity
Truman became a minor celebrity during the two months of volcanic activity preceding the 1980 eruption of Mount St. Helens, giving interviews to reporters and expressing his opinion that the danger was exaggerated. "I don't have any idea whether it will blow," he said, "but I don't believe it to the point that I'm going to pack up." Truman displayed little concern about the volcano and his situation: "If the mountain goes, I'm going with it. This area is heavily timbered, Spirit Lake is in between me and the mountain, and the mountain is a mile away, the mountain ain't gonna hurt me." Law-enforcement officials were incensed by his refusal to evacuate because media representatives kept entering the restricted zone near the volcano to interview him, endangering themselves in the process. Still, Truman remained steadfast. "You couldn't pull me out with a mule team. That mountain's part of Truman and Truman's part of that mountain."

Truman told reporters that he was knocked from his bed by precursor earthquakes, so he responded by moving his mattress to the basement. He claimed to wear spurs to bed to cope with the earthquakes while he slept. He scoffed at the public's concern for his safety, responding to scientists' claims about the threat of the volcano that "the mountain has shot its wad and it hasn't hurt my place a bit, but those goddamn geologists with their hair down to their butts wouldn't pay no attention to ol' Truman."

As a result of his defiant commentary, Truman became something of a folk hero, and was the subject of many songs and poems by children. One group of children from Salem, Oregon, sent him banners inscribed "Harry – We Love You", which moved him so much that he took a helicopter trip (paid for by National Geographic) to visit them on May 14. He also received many fan letters, including several marriage proposals. A group of fifth graders from Grand Blanc, Michigan, wrote letters that brought him to tears. In return, he sent them a letter and volcanic ash, which the students later sold to buy flowers for his family after the eruption.

He caused a media frenzy, appearing on the front page of The New York Times and The San Francisco Examiner and attracting the attention of National Geographic, United Press International, and The Today Show. Many major magazines composed profiles, including Time, Life, Newsweek, Field & Stream, and Reader's Digest. A historian named Richard W. Slatta wrote that "his fiery attitude, brash speech, love of the outdoors, and fierce independence… made him a folk hero the media could adore." Slatta pointed to Truman's "unbendable character and response to the forces of nature" as a source of his rise to fame, and the interviews with him added "color" to reports about the events at Mount St. Helens. Truman was immortalized, according to Slatta, "with many of the embellished qualities of the western hero", and the media spotlight created a persona that was "in some ways quite different from his true character."

Death
As the likelihood of eruption increased, state officials tried to evacuate the area with the exception of a few scientists and security officials. On May 17, they attempted one final time to persuade Truman to leave, to no avail. The volcano erupted the next morning, and its entire northern flank collapsed. Truman and his 16 cats were alone together at his lodge, and all are presumed to have died in the eruption on May 18. He likely died of heat shock in less than a second, too quickly to register pain, before his body would have been inevitably all but entirely vaporized. 

The largest landslide in recorded history and a pyroclastic flow traveling atop the landslide engulfed the Spirit Lake area almost simultaneously, destroying the lake and burying the site of his lodge under  of volcanic landslide debris. Authorities never found Truman's remains. Truman considered his cats family and mentioned them in almost all public statements. They too presumably perished in similar conditions.

Friends hoped that Truman might have survived, as he had claimed to have provisioned an abandoned mine shaft with food and liquor in case of an eruption, but the lack of immediate warning of the oncoming eruption probably prevented him from escaping to the shaft before the pyroclastic flow reached his lodge (less than a minute after it began). Even if Truman had made it there, the aforementioned landslide would likely have suffocated him, and/or prevented his rescue. His sister Geraldine said that she found it hard to accept the reality of his death. "I don't think he made it, but I thought if they would let me fly over and see for myself that Harry's lodge is gone, then maybe I'd believe it for sure." 

Truman's niece Shirley Rosen added that her uncle thought he could escape the volcano but was not expecting the lateral eruption. She stated that her sister took him a bottle of Bourbon whiskey to persuade him to evacuate, but he was too afraid to drink alcohol at the time because he was unsure whether the shaking was coming from his body or the earthquakes. His possessions were auctioned off as keepsakes to admirers in September 1980.

Legacy

Truman emerged as a folk hero for his resistance to the evacuation efforts. The Columbian wrote: "With his 10-dollar name and hell-no-I-won't-go attitude, Truman was a made-for-prime-time folk hero." His friends and family commented: "He was a very opinionated person." Truman's friend John Garrity added, "The mountain and the lake were his life. If he'd left and then saw what the mountain did to his lake, it would have killed him anyway. He always said he wanted to die at Spirit Lake. He went the way he wanted to go." 

Truman's niece Shirley stated, "He used to say that's my mountain and my lake and he would say those are my arms and my legs. If he would have seen it the way it is now, I don't think he would have survived." Truman's cousin Richard Ice commented that Truman's short period as a celebrity was "the peak of his life."

Truman was the subject of the books Truman of St. Helens: The Man and His Mountain by his niece Shirley Rosen, and The Legend of Harry Truman by his sister Geri Whiting. He was portrayed by Art Carney, his favorite actor, in the 1981 docudrama St. Helens. Memorabilia were sold in the area surrounding Mount St. Helens, including Harry Truman hats, pictures, posters, and postcards. A restaurant opened in Anchorage, Alaska, named after him, serving dishes such as Harry's Hot Molten Chili. 

According to The Washington Star, more than 100 songs had been composed in Truman's honor by 1981, in addition to a commemorative album titled The Musical Legend Of Harry Truman — A Very Special Collection Of Mount St. Helens’ Volcano Songs. He is the subject of the 2007 song "Harry Truman" written and recorded by Irish band Headgear. Lula Belle Garland wrote "The Legend of Harry And The Mountain," which was recorded in 1980 by Ron Shaw & The Desert Wind Band. 

Musicians Ron Allen and Steve Asplund wrote a country rock song in 1980 called "Harry Truman, Your Spirit Still Lives On". Billy Jonas included Truman's narrative in his song "Old St. Helen" in 1993.

Truman Trail and Harry's Ridge in the Mount St. Helens region are named after him. The Harry R. Truman Memorial Park was named in his honor in Castle Rock, Washington, though it later was renamed Castle Rock Lions Club Volunteer Park.

References

Further reading

External links
 "Harry (Of Mount Saint Helens)" Recorded in 1982 by Penny Lew.
"Thank You Lord, for Harry" Recorded in 1982 by Shawn Wright & The Brothers Band 

1896 births
1980 deaths
Bootleggers
Deaths in volcanic eruptions
Military personnel from Washington (state)
Natural disaster deaths in Washington (state)
People from Chehalis, Washington
People from Clay County, West Virginia
People from Skamania County, Washington
United States Army Air Service pilots of World War I
United States Army soldiers